Hdoudi Sama (lit. "The sky is my limit") is a studio album by Carole Samaha. It was released in December 2009 and features 13 songs. Included is Carole's solo song from the soundtrack of the Pepsi musical Sea of Stars (Bahr El Nujoum) "Jeet" (here renamed "Majnouni (Jeet)").

In June 2010 Carole Samaha received the Best Album Murex d'Or award for this album and in 2011 the music video for the song Khallik Bhalak won the Murex d'Or award for best music video.

Music videos 

Several music videos with songs featured in this album have been released:

Track listing

References 

 Album liner notes
 "Yama Layali", "Jeet (Majnouni)", "Ali", "Ragaalak", "Zabehny", "Ma Bkhaf", "A'oul Anssak", "Khallik Bhalak" music videos

Carole Samaha albums
2009 albums